The 1980–81 Danish 1. division season was the 24th season of ice hockey in Denmark. Eight teams participated in the league, and AaB Ishockey won the championship. Esbjerg IK was relegated.

Regular season

External links
Season on eliteprospects.com

Dan
1980 in Danish sport
1981 in Danish sport